The Church of St Bartholomew in Ubley, Somerset, England is a small medieval church originating from the 13th century with later additions. It has been designated as a Grade I listed building.

The church has no fixed pews. Features include a Jacobean pulpit and a chained copy of the ‘Paraphrases of Erasmus’ dated 1552. The 13th century stone font stone font has a square bowl. The pulpit is from the 17th century.
The stained glass in the east window dates from 1877 and was painted by Jean-Baptiste Capronnier.

On the north side of the church is the remains of a Fives court.

It is part a joint Benefice of Blagdon with Compton Martin which is part of the deanery of Chew Magna and the Archdeaconry of Bath.

See also

 List of Grade I listed buildings in Bath and North East Somerset
 List of towers in Somerset
 List of ecclesiastical parishes in the Diocese of Bath and Wells

References

13th-century church buildings in England
Grade I listed churches in Somerset
Church of England church buildings in Bath and North East Somerset
Grade I listed buildings in Bath and North East Somerset